Omar Monjaraz Campos (born 11 May 1981) is a Mexican football defender.

Career
Born in León, Guanajuato, Monjaraz began playing football with local side Club León. He debuted in the Mexican Primera División with León in 1999, and would feature for C.F. La Piedad, Chiapas, Puebla F.C. and San Luis F.C. in the league until 2009. While with San Luis, Monjaraz participated in the Copa Libertadores, the club's first entry into international club competition.

Honours
Mexico U23
CONCACAF Olympic Qualifying Championship: 2004

References

External links

1981 births
Living people
Liga MX players
Club León footballers
Chiapas F.C. footballers
Club Puebla players
San Luis F.C. players
Lobos BUAP footballers
Association football defenders
Footballers from Guanajuato
Sportspeople from León, Guanajuato
Mexican footballers
Central American and Caribbean Games silver medalists for Mexico
Competitors at the 2002 Central American and Caribbean Games
Central American and Caribbean Games medalists in football